The 24th Venice Biennale, held in 1948, was an exhibition of international contemporary art, with 15 participating nations. The Venice Biennale takes place biennially in Venice, Italy. Winners of the Gran Premi (Grand Prize) included French painter Georges Braque, British sculptor Henry Moore, French etcher Marc Chagall, and Italians painter Giorgio Morandi, sculptor Giacomo Manzù, and etcher Mino Maccari.

References

Bibliography

Further reading 

 
 
 
 
 
 
 
 
 
 
 
 
 
 
 
 
 
 
 
 
 
 

1948 in art
1948 in Italy
Venice Biennale exhibitions